Montignac may refer to:

Surname
 Michel Montignac (1944–2010), French dietician, best known for his Montignac diet

Places in France
 Montignac, Gironde, in the Gironde department
 Montignac, Hautes-Pyrénées, in the Hautes-Pyrénées department
 Montignac-Charente, in the Charente department
 Montignac-de-Lauzun, in the Lot-et-Garonne department
 Montignac-Lascaux, in the Dordogne department
 Montignac-le-Coq, in the Charente department
 Montignac-Toupinerie, in the Lot-et-Garonne department

See also
 Montignac diet, a weight-loss diet created by Michel Montignac